Tiit is predominantly an Estonian masculine given name and occurs, to a lesser extent, as a surname.

Given name
Tiit Arge (born 1963), politician
Tiit Helimets (born 1977), ballet dancer 
Tiit Haagma (1954–2021), ice yacht sailor and musician (Ruja)
Tiit Härm (born 1946),  ballet dancer, ballet master and choreographer
Tiit Helmja (born 1945), rower
Tiit Hennoste (born 1953), linguist
Tiit Käbin (1937–2011), jurist and politician
Tiit Kala (born 1954), politician 
Tiit Kaljundi (1946–2008), architect
Tiit Kändler (born 1948), humorist and science journalist
Tiit Kuningas (born 1949), sports journalist
Tiit Kuusik (1911–1990), opera singer
Tiit Kuusmik (born 1950), politician
Tiit Lääne (born 1958), sportsman, sports journalist and politician
Tiit Land (born 1964), biochemist
Tiit Lilleorg (1941–2021), actor
Tiit Made (born 1940), economist, journalist, publicist and politician 
Tiit Madisson (1950–2021), dissident, writer and politician 
Tiit Niilo (born 1962), politician
Tiit Nuudi (born 1949), tennis player and politician
Tiit Pääsuke (born 1941), painter
Tiit Rosenberg (born 1946), historian
Tiit Salumäe (born 1951), Lutheran prelate
Tiit Sinissaar (born 1947), politician 
Tiit Sokk (born 1964), basketball player 
Tiit Sukk (born 1974), actor, television presenter, and director
Tiit Tamm (born 1952), ski jumper and coach
Tiit Tammsaar (born 1951), politician
Tiit Terik (born 1979), politician 
Tiit Tikerpe (born 1965), sprint canoer and Olympic competitor
Tiit Toomsalu (born 1949), politician
Tiit Trummal (born 1954), architect
Tiit Vähi (born 1947), politician and former Prime Minister of Estonia
Tiit-Rein Viitso (born 1938), linguist

Surname
Ene-Margit Tiit (born 1934), Estonian mathematician and statistician
Valdur Tiit (1931-2019), Estonian physicist

References

Estonian masculine given names
Estonian-language surnames